Josef Hrnčíř (2 April 1921 – 31 August 2014) was a Czech conductor, musicologist and music theorist. In 2008, he received the Award of Society for Science and Arts.

He died at age 93.

References

1921 births
2014 deaths
Czech conductors (music)
Male conductors (music)
Czechoslovak musicians